Alsace wine or Alsatian wine is produced in the Alsace region in France and is primarily white wine. Because of its Germanic influence, it is the only Appellation d'Origine Contrôlée region in France to produce mostly varietal wines, typically from similar grape varieties to those used in German wine. Along with Austria and Germany, it produces some of the most noted dry Rieslings in the world as well as highly aromatic Gewürztraminer wines. Wines are produced under three different AOCs: Alsace AOC for white, rosé and red wines, Alsace Grand Cru AOC for white wines from certain classified vineyards and Crémant d'Alsace AOC for sparkling wines. Both dry and sweet white wines are produced.

In 2006, vines were grown on 15,298 hectares (37,800 acres) in 119 villages in Alsace, and 111.3 million litres of wine was produced, corresponding to 148.4 million bottles of 750 mL, generating 478.8 million euro in revenue. Of the vineyard surface, 78% was classified for the production of AOC Alsace wines, 4% for AOC Alsace Grand Cru, and 18% for AOC Crémant d'Alsace. About 90% of the wine produced is white. 25% of the production is exported, and the five largest export markets for still Alsace wine in terms of volume are Belgium, Netherlands, Germany, Denmark and the United States.

History

An important influence in the history of Alsace wine has been the repeated changes of nationality of the Alsace region, which has passed from France to Germany and vice versa several times throughout history. In the early history of the Alsace wine industry, they were traded together with other German wines since Rhine provided the means to transport the wines. In much of the post–World War II era, wine styles in Alsace and Germany diverged, as Alsace wines remained fully fermented, that is dry, to a large extent because they were intended to be paired with food. In the same era, Alsace has also experienced a drive to higher quality, which led to AOC status being awarded. In recent decades, the difference between Alsace and Germany has diminished, since German wines have become drier and more powerful, while many Alsace wines have become sweeter and the late harvest and dessert style wines have been "rediscovered" in Alsace since the VT and SGN designations were introduced in 1983.

The total vineyard surface in Alsace has increased over the last decades, although the total French vineyard surface has decreased. Over the same period of time, among the varieties, Pinot gris has increased the most, from 4% to 15% of the vineyard surface, while Sylvaner has decreased the most.

Use of the name "Tokay" in Alsace
The grape variety Pinot gris is believed to have been taken to Hungary in the 14th century, where it was named Szürkebarát. It is further believed to have been brought back to Alsace by General Lazarus von Schwendi after his campaign against the Turks in the 16th century. It was planted in Kientzheim under the name "Tokay", taken from Hungary's most famous wine Tokaji, which does not use Pinot gris, but rather Furmint and Hárslevelű mainly. For a long time, the Alsatian wines produced from this variety were labelled Tokay d'Alsace. However, in 1993, an agreement was reached between Hungary and the European Union (of which Hungary was not yet a member) to phase out the name Tokay from non-Hungarian wine. In the case of Alsace, the name Tokay Pinot gris was used as an intermediate step, with the "Tokay" part eliminated in 2007.

Geography, geology and terroir

The geography of the wine growing area in Alsace is determined by two main factors, the Vosges mountains in the west and the Rhine river in the east. The vineyards are concentrated in a narrow strip, running in a roughly north–south direction, on the lower eastern slopes of the Vosges, at altitudes of 175–420 m. Those altitudes provide a good balance between temperature, drainage and sun exposure under Alsace's growing conditions. Because of predominantly westerly winds, the Vosges mountains tend to shelter Alsace from rain and maritime influence, and the region is therefore rather dry and sunny. Rainfall in Colmar is 500 mm, but can vary greatly between sites, and is the driest city in France. While the slope down the Vosges is generally east-facing, many of the best sites are south-west to south-east facing, and benefit from extra sun exposure.

Alsace's geology is quite varied, with many different kinds of soils represented in the vineyards. Alsace's soils are a result of its location at a geological fault. Alsace as a whole is located on the western part of the Rhine Graben, which is the result of two systems of parallel faults, with a dropped down block between the Vosges and the Black Forest.

Wine styles

Almost all wines are white, except those made from the Pinot noir grape which are pale red, often rosé, rarely red (e.g. Rouge d'Ottrott). Sparkling wines known as Crémant d'Alsace are also made. Much of the white wines of Alsace are made from aromatic grape varieties, so many characteristic Alsace wines are aromatic, floral and spicy. Since they very seldom have any oak barrel aromas they tend to be very varietally pure in their character. Traditionally all Alsace wines were dry (which once set them apart from German wines with which they share many grape varieties), but an ambition to produce wines with more intense and fruity character has led some producers to produce wines which contain some residual sugar. Since there is no official labeling that differentiates completely dry from off-dry (or even semi-sweet) wines, this has occasionally led to some confusion among consumers. It is more common to find residual sugar in Gewürztraminer and Pinot gris, which reach a higher natural sugar content on ripeness, than in Riesling, Muscat or Sylvaner. Usually there is a "house style" as to residual sugar, i.e., some producers only produce totally dry wines, except for their dessert style wines.

Almost all production in Alsace is of AOC wine, since there is no Vin de pays region which covers Alsace. Thus, the only alternative to producing AOC wine is to declassify it all the way down to Vin de table, which generally means that neither grape varieties, region of origin or vintage may be identified. However, this solution is mostly avoided since edelzwicker and gentil may be blended from several varieties, i.e. varieties that exceed the AOC rules in the concerned season.

Bottles 

There is a legal requirement for bottling Alsace wine in tall bottles commonly called . In the AOC rules, the bottle type is actually called vin du Rhin, i.e., "Rhine wine bottle". Without being mandated by law, this bottle format is also common and traditional in many German regions, particularly for Riesling and other traditional white wine varieties.

Late harvest wines

There are two late harvest classifications, Vendange Tardive (VT) and Sélection de Grains Nobles (SGN). Vendange Tardive means "late harvest" (which in German would be Spätlese), but in terms of must weight requirements, VT is similar to Auslese in Germany. Sélection de Grains Nobles means "selection of noble berries", i.e. grapes affected by noble rot, and is similar to a German Beerenauslese. For both VT and SGN, Alsace wines tend to be higher in alcohol and therefore slightly lower in sugar than the corresponding German wines. Therefore, Riesling VT and Muscat VT tend to be semi-sweet rather than sweet, while Gewürztraminer and Pinot gris tend to be rather sweet already at VT level. But as is the case with sweetness in other Alsace wines, this depends to a large extent on the house style of the producer.

The required level of ripeness of the grapes, which was increased in 2001, are as follows, expressed as sugar content of the must and potential alcohol:

The producer Aimé Stentz produces a late harvest Pinot blanc known as Pi-Noblesse, which is ineligible for either VT or SGN labelling.

The minimum required must weights have again been increased to the following:

VT: Riesling, Muscat, Muscat Ottonel: 235 g/L (formerly 220 g/L); Pinot Gris, Gewürztraminer: 257 g/L (formerly 243 g/L)

SGN: Riesling, Muscat, Muscat Ottonel: 276 g/L (formerly 256 g/L); Pinot Gris, Gewürztraminer: 306 g/L (formerly 279 g/L)

Grape varieties

Over the last decades, plantings of Riesling, Pinot noir and in particular Pinot gris have increased, while Sylvaner (once the most grown variety) and Chasselas have been on the decrease.

Varietal labels and similar designations

Alsace is known for being the only French wine-growing region with a long practice in varietal labeling, which was a German tradition long before varietally labelled New world wines scored considerable export success. However, under appellation rules, not all varietal-sounding names on labels need to correspond to a single grape variety. Only one varietal label may be used on a wine, and a blend may not have more than one varietal name on the label.

Non-AOC wines

Almost all Alsace wine is produced under one of the region's three AOC designations—Alsace, Alsace Grand Cru and Crémant d'Alsace. Unlike most other French wine regions, there exists no Vin de pays designation for Alsace. This means that wines that do not qualify for AOC status have to be sold as simple Vin de table de France. This happens in some instances when producers wish to use other grape varieties in their wine, like Domaine Zind-Humbrecht which sells its cuvée Zind, a blend of 65% Chardonnay and 35% Auxerrois.

Industry structure 
Up to 2,000 growers bottle their own wine, but more than 80% of the wine is produced by 175 producers, including many winemaking cooperatives. Even the largest winemaking companies/négociants in Alsace tend to be family-owned. In 2001, approximately 45% of Alsace wine was made by cooperatives.

Producers 

Some of the best known producers include Maison Trimbach, Domaine Zind-Humbrecht, Hugel & Fils, Léon Beyer, Weinbach, Josmeyer and Marcel Deiss. Many of the larger houses, such as Hugel, sell both wines from their own vineyards and market wines they have produced from purchased grapes, i.e., operate as négociant. Producers calling themselves "Domaine", such as Zind-Humbrecht, are supposed to only use grapes from their own vineyards. There are also several winemaking cooperatives, some of which have a rather good reputation.

Route des Vins d'Alsace 

The Route des Vins d'Alsace (Wine route of Alsace) is an approximately  road, crossing the main wine producing areas of the region. From north to south, the following 67 communes crossed by the Route are:

 Marlenheim
 Wangen
 Westhoffen
 Traenheim
 Bergbieten
 Dangolsheim
 Soultz-les-Bains
 Avolsheim
 Molsheim
 Rosheim
 Boersch
 Ottrott
 Obernai
 Bernardswiller
 Heiligenstein
 Barr
 Mittelbergheim
 Andlau
 Itterswiller
 Nothalten
 Blienschwiller
 Dambach-la-Ville
 Scherwiller
 Châtenois
 Kintzheim
 Orschwiller
 Saint-Hippolyte
 Rodern
 Rorschwihr
 Bergheim
 Ribeauvillé
 Hunawihr
 Zellenberg
 Riquewihr
 Beblenheim
 Mittelwihr
 Bennwihr
 Sigolsheim
 Kientzheim
 Kaysersberg
 Ammerschwihr
 Ingersheim
 Niedermorschwihr
 Turckheim
 Colmar
 Wintzenheim
 Wettolsheim
 Eguisheim
 Husseren-les-Châteaux
 Voegtlinshoffen
 Obermorschwihr
 Hattstatt
 Gueberschwihr
 Pfaffenheim
 Rouffach
 Westhalten
 Soultzmatt
 Orschwihr
 Bergholtz
 Guebwiller
 Soultz
 Wuenheim
 Cernay
 Vieux-Thann
 Thann

References

External links 
 The Official Alsace wines home page (CIVA)
 The wines of Alsace—The official website of France (in English)
 Wines, villages and terroirs of Alsace